The Ragged Valley Shale is a geologic formation in California. It preserves fossils dating back to the Cretaceous period.

See also

 List of fossiliferous stratigraphic units in California
 Paleontology in California

References
 

Cretaceous California
Shale formations of the United States